The CONCACAF Women's Under-20 Championship is an association football competition for women's national under-20 teams in the North America, Central America and Caribbean region. It serves as the qualification tournament for the FIFA U-20 Women's World Cup.

Results

There was no championship final in 2002; both the United States and Mexico qualified for the 2002 FIFA U-19 Women's World Championship as group winners.  Final Standings by points.

Winners by country

Participating nations
Legend

 – Champions
 – Runners-up
 – Third place
 – Fourth place
 – Finalist
 – Semi-finalist
QF – Quarterfinals
GS – Group stage
R16 – Round of 16
q – Qualified for upcoming tournament
 — Hosts
 --  – Did not qualify/enter

Awards

Golden Boot
The topscorers of the final tournaments were:

Golden Ball

Golden Glove

CONCACAF Fair Play Award

Winning coaches

See also
 FIFA U-20 Women's World Cup
 CONCACAF Women's U-17 Championship
 CONCACAF Under-20 Championship

References

External links
 

 
Under-20
Under-20 association football
Youth football competitions